Tai Situpa (from ) is one of the oldest lineages of tulkus (reincarnated lamas) in the Kagyu school of Tibetan Buddhism In Tibetan Buddhism tradition, Kenting Tai Situpa is considered as emanation of Bodhisattva Maitreya and Guru Padmasambhava (Guru Rinpoche) and who has been incarnated numerous times as Indian and Tibetan yogis since the time of the historical Buddha.

History 
The Tai Situpa is one of the highest-ranking lamas of the Karma Kagyu lineage. Chokyi Gyaltsen was the first to bear the title "Grand Situ", conferred upon him in 1407 by the Yongle Emperor of Ming China. He was a close disciple of Deshin Shekpa, 5th Karmapa Lama, who appointed him abbot of Karma Goen, the Karmapa's principal monastery at the time. The full title bestowed was Kenting Naya Tang Nyontse Geshetse Tai Situpa which is shortened to Kenting Tai Situ. The full title means "far reaching, unshakable, great master, holder of the command". The 9th Karmapa bestowed the 5th Kenting Tai Situpa a Red Vajra Crown of Radiant Gold, which mirrored the Karmapa's own Black Vajra Crown. The Red Crown symbolizes the inseparability of the Karmapa and Kenting Tai Situpa. Through seeing the Red Crown, which is presented in a ceremony even today by the Kenting Tai Situpa, one is instantly and irreversibly set onto the path of enlightenment and receives the blessing of the Bodhisattva Maitreya.

The current, 12th Tai Situpa, Pema Tönyö Nyinje, was born in a farming family named Liyultsang in 1954 in the village of Palmey, which is part of Palyul or Baiyü County, Sichuan, China that was formerly part of the Kingdom of Derge. The Palpung Thupten Chokhorling monastery in Derge was founded by the 8th Tai Situpa "Situ Panchen" in 1727, where presently all the traditional Buddhist teachings are taught to the monks and has preserved traditional printing centre for the Buddhist teaching scrolls.

At the age of twenty-two, the 12th Tai Situpa founded his own new monastic seat, Palpung Sherabling Monastery, Himachal Pradesh, in Northeast India providing traditional Buddhist teachings, astronomy, traditional Tibetan medicine curriculum, higher Tibetan Buddhist university teaching (Shedra), primary teachings to young students, sports facility for students for physical fitness, traditional Tibetan herbs medicine garden, medical clinic , old age home and has accommodations for students. Palpung Sherabling Monastery currently has approximately 1000 monks; 250 are enrolled in the monastic university curriculum on the premises. Palpung Yeshe Rabgyeling Nun Monastery is located near the city of Manali, in the Bunthar town has about 200 nuns. The Monastery also offers the traditional Kagyu three-year retreat for both monks and nuns on the compound. The Palpung congregation[10] consists of monasteries and temples throughout some Chinese and Tibetan districts. Palpung Congregation also has branch institutions in Europe, USA, Canada Oceania and Asia. The 12th Tai Situpa traveled widely, making his first visit to the West in 1981 to Kagyu Samye Ling Monastery and Tibetan Centre in Scotland.

The 12th Tai Situpa was instrumental in recognizing Ogyen Trinley Dorje,  the 17th Karmapa, whom he enthroned at the Tsurphu Monastery the traditional ancient seat of the Karmapa outside Lhasa in August 1992. He also recognized Choseng Trungpa, born on February 6, 1989, in Chamdo County, Tibet Autonomous Region, as the reincarnation of Chögyam Trungpa.

Lineage of the Tai Situpas 
 Chokyi Gyaltsen (1377–1448)
 Tashi Namgyal (1450–1497)
 Tashi Paljor (1498–1541)
 Mitrug Gocha (1542–1585)
 Chokyi Gyaltsen Gelek Palzang (1586–1657)
 Mipham Trinlay Rabten (1658–1682)
 Lekshe Mawe Nyima (1683–1698)
 Situ Panchen (1700–1774)
 Pema Nyingche Wangpo (1774–1853)
 Pema Kunzang Chogyal (1854–1885)
 Pema Wangchok Gyalpo (1886–1952)
 Pema Tönyö Nyinje (1954- )

References

External links 

 Trikaya del Lama Kunsal Kassapa 
 Lineage of H. E. Palpung Chamgon Kuanding Tai Situ Rinpoche
 Information about previous and current Tai Situpas, Sherab Ling  (archived July 4th 2008)
 Short biography of all 12 Tai Situpas by Ken Holmes
 news and images of the 12 Tai Situpas by Karma Kagyu Cyber World
 

Situ
Tibetan Buddhist titles
Karma Kagyu lamas
Palpung Tai Situ tulkus